Queensland Poetry Festival is the flagship program of Queensland Poetry one of Australia's premier organisations for all things poetry. It exists to support and promote a poetry culture in Queensland and Australia, embracing the wide possibility of poetic expression in all of its forms. As well as hosting an annual festival,  Queensland Poetry  also produces a number of signature projects and programs throughout the year.

History 

QPF was originally founded by Brett Dionysius in 1997, an organisational role he continued in until 2001 when it was being run as the Subverse: Queensland Poetry Festival. Queensland Poetry Festival then continued under a number of Directors and Managers including Rosanna Licari (2002–2003) and Graham Nunn (2004–2007) whilst becoming the incorporated entity Queensland Poetry Festival Inc in 2007. Since this new inception QPF has been directed by Julie Beveridge (2008–2009), Sarah Gory (2011–2014), Co-Directors Anne-Marie Te Whiu and David Stavanger (2015–2017), Lucy Nelson (2018–19), and Shane Strange (2022-)

In 2016 an event was held at Government House, Brisbane as a Celebration of the Queensland Poetry Festival's 20th Anniversary. In a speech delivered by His Excellency the Honourable Paul de Jersey AC as Administrator of the Government of the Commonwealth of Australia, he said:Not only poetry, but also poets, have enjoyed special status. They have been credited with exceptional insight into our existence, coupled with great expressive powers ... for twenty years, the Queensland Poetry Festival has been a wonderful champion of the enormous cultural wealth that resides in poetry, particularly our own, and of poetry's capacity to enrich our Queensland communities and our State's culture.QPF's 2017 Arts Queensland Poet in Residence, award-winning Mvskoke/USA poet and musician Joy Harjo said:I have travelled to festivals, performances and residencies all over the world, from the U.S., to Europe, to India, to South America. The Queensland Poetry Festival residency remains one of the most memorable. I was warmly welcomed and taken care of from even before I arrived, then throughout the residency. Every detail was covered. I encountered a generosity of spirit in the sponsors and participants of each workshop, performance, and of course, the community. It was apparent that the Queensland Poetry Festival had made a beloved place in the community, through the efforts of its leadership and staff. They have a committed fan, in me.The 2016 festival saw the emergence of a strong commitment to including more diverse and Indigenous voices including the creation of the Indigenous Poet in Residence (Sam Wagan Watson 2016 and Ali Cobby Eckermann 2017) & the inaugural Oodgeroo Noonuccal Indigenous Poetry Prize. Queensland Poetry maintains its commitment to supporting voices of Country.

During the Covid pandemic (2020, 2021), Queensland Poetry switched to providing a number of online programs in lieu of a live festival. In June of 2022, the first live festival was held in Brisbane/Meanjin with  the theme 'Emerge'. It was the first festival held live since 2019.

Queensland Poetry administers and manages a year-long program of poetry workshops, programs, events, and competitions. These include: three Arts Queensland Poetry Awards in the Val Vallis Poetry Award, Thomas Shapcott Poetry Prize and the XYZ Prize for Excellence in Spoken Word (introduced in 2015), the Arts Queensland Poet in Residence, SlammED! and the Australian Poetry Slam QLD Heats & Final. Queensland Poetry also partners on programs such as the monthly VOLTA event at Brisbane Square Library.

Organisational structure 

The current structure of Queensland Poetry includes a Management Committee, a General Manager, Artistic Director, Events and Marketing Manager and program coordinators.. In 2016 Queensland Poetry was successful for the first time in applying for Organisational Funding for Operational/Staff costs for the 2017–2020 period via Arts Queensland. Since 2007 QP has been an incorporated community organisation with a dedicated and growing audience, with a strong tradition of volunteerism and known increasingly for celebrating poetry in all of its forms. QP currently has office space under a tenancy agreement with the Queensland Writers Centre, in the State Library of Queensland.

Oodgeroo Noonuccal Indigenous Poetry Prize

In 2016 the Queensland Poetry Festival introduced an Indigenous program, which included the inaugural Oodgeroo Noonuccal Indigenous Poetry Prize.

The prize was named in honour of Aboriginal poet Oodgeroo Noonuccal, with the permission of her family and after consultation with Quandamooka Festival. It is the only open-age Indigenous poetry prize for an unpublished poem. Past winners have included Brenda Saunders, Andrew Booth & Julie Janson, Jeanine Leane, and Sachem Parkin-Owens.

Past guests 

In its history the festival has featured some of the world's finest poets, spoken word artists singer/songwriters and other artists including Mark Doty (US), Ali Cobby Eckermann, Joy Harjo (US), Jennifer Maiden and Maxine Beneba Clarke in 2017; Tracy K. Smith (US), Jeet Thayil (India), Lionel Fogarty, Ivan Coyote (Canada) and Tishani Doshi (India) in 2016; Kate Durbin (US), Les Murray, MacGillivray (Scotland) and David Brooks in 2015; Warsan Shire (UK) and Christian Bok (2014); Shane Rhodes (2013 – Canada); Angela Rawlings (2012 – Canada); Jacob Polley (2011 – UK) Emily XYZ (2010 – USA) and August Kleinzahler (2010 – USA), Hinemoana Baker (NZ) and Neil Murray (2009) Shane Koyczan (2007 – Canada), Chris Bailey (2005 – The Saints), and Dave Graney (2006).

See also

 List of festivals in Brisbane
 List of festivals in Australia

References

External links 
 Official website

Poetry festivals in Australia
Literary festivals in Australia
Festivals in Brisbane
Festivals established in 1997
1997 establishments in Australia